Aleksander Antoni Włodzimierz Małecki (4 September 1901 – September 1939) was a Polish fencer. He won a bronze medal in the team sabre event at the 1928 Summer Olympics.

Małecki served in the Polish Army and fought in the September Campaign of World War II. He was probably killed during an attempt to escape to Hungary.

References

External links
 

1901 births
1939 deaths
People from Ternopil Oblast
Polish Austro-Hungarians
People from the Kingdom of Galicia and Lodomeria
Polish male fencers
Olympic fencers of Poland
Fencers at the 1928 Summer Olympics
Olympic bronze medalists for Poland
Olympic medalists in fencing
Polish military personnel of World War II
Medalists at the 1928 Summer Olympics
Polish military personnel killed in World War II
20th-century Polish people